Acronicta strigulata is a moth of the family Noctuidae. It is found from British Columbia, south to California.

The wingspan is about 35 mm.

External links
Image

Acronicta
Moths of North America
Moths described in 1897